A Laboratory Manual for Comparative Vertebrate Anatomy is a textbook written by Libbie Hyman in 1922 and released as the first edition from the University of Chicago press. It is also called and published simply as Comparative Vertebrate Anatomy. In 1942 Hyman released the second edition as a textbook, as well as a laboratory manual. It was referred to as her 'bread and butter', as she relied on its royalties for income. The Laboratory Manual for Comparative Vertebrate Anatomy still remains the same without revisions, and is used by universities around the world. In the book, she uses Balanoglossus, Amphioxus, sea squirt, lamprey, skate, shark, turtle, alligator, chicken, and cat as specimens.

Anatomy books
1922 non-fiction books
1942 non-fiction books
University of Chicago Press books
Biology textbooks
American non-fiction books
1922 in biology